The  Helianthus III  was a yacht, built by Nathanael Greene Herreshoff (1848–1938) in 1924. She was a ketch-rigged wooden vessel, 62½' long on deck with a 13'-9" beam and 4'-6" draft. Before being lost at sea in the 1990s, she was docked at Annapolis, Anne Arundel County, Maryland.

She was listed on the National Register of Historic Places in 1984.

References

External links
, including undated photo, at Maryland Historical Trust

Anne Arundel County, Maryland
Ships on the National Register of Historic Places in Maryland
Individual sailing vessels
National Register of Historic Places in Annapolis, Maryland
Sailboat type designs by Nathanael Greene Herreshoff